Neuralia can refer to:

 Neuralia (animal), the clade containing Cnidaria, Ctenophora and Bilateria